The 2017 Copa Verde was the 4th edition of a football competition held in  Brazil. Featuring 18 clubs, Acre, Distrito Federal and Mato Grosso do Sul have two spots; Amapá, Amazonas, Espírito Santo, Mato Grosso, Pará, Rondônia, Roraima and Tocantins with one each. The others four berths was set according to CBF ranking.

In the finals, Luverdense defeated Paysandu 4–2 on aggregate to win their first title and a place in the Round of 16 of the 2018 Copa do Brasil.

Qualified teams

Schedule
The schedule of the competition is as follows.

Preliminary round

|}

Bracket

Finals

Luverdense won 4–2 on aggregate.

References

Copa Verde
Copa Verde
Copa Verde